Ziersdorf is a town in the district of Hollabrunn in Lower Austria, Austria.

Geography
Ziersdorf lies in the Weinviertel in Lower Austria. About 18.76 percent of the municipality is forested.

It consists of the villages Dippersdorf, Fahndorf, Gettsdorf, Großmeiseldorf, Hollenstein, Kiblitz, Radlbrunn, Rohrbach and Ziersdorf.

References

External links 

Cities and towns in Hollabrunn District